Hermann Lieb (also known as Herman Lieb; May 23, 1826 – March 5, 1908) was a Swiss immigrant to the United States who served in the Union Army during the American Civil War. He is best remembered as the commander of the Union forces at the Battle of Milliken's Bend in 1863.

Biography
Lieb was born in on May 23, 1826 in Ermatingen, Switzerland, to Sigmund Friedrich Lieb and Christine Vasmer, and was educated in Zürich, Vevey, and in France. In 1846 he moved to Paris, where he worked as a merchant, and there took part in the French Revolution of 1848. Lieb emigrated to the United States and settled in 1856 in Decatur, Illinois, where he began practicing law. He was also an editor of the Chicago Democrat.

American Civil War
At the outbreak of the war, he enlisted for ninety days as a private in Company B of the 8th Illinois Infantry. Upon reorganization of the regiment as a three-year unit in July 1861, Lieb was elected captain and the following year was promoted to major.  He fought at the battles of Fort Donelson, Shiloh and the siege of Corinth.

On April 14, 1863 he was appointed colonel of the 9th Louisiana Regiment of African Descent. During the Vicksburg campaign Lieb commanded the post of Milliken's Bend along the Mississippi River. Here, on June 7, 1863, Lieb defeated Confederate forces under General Henry E. McCulloch and was wounded during the fighting. On August 7 his unit was converted into an artillery unit which eventually became the 5th U.S. Colored Heavy Artillery. With his regiment he performed garrison duty in the Vicksburg area for the remainder of 1863. On May 6, 1864, he was given command of the artillery forces of the Post of Vicksburg.

On March 13, 1865 Lieb was promoted to brevet brigadier general of U.S. Volunteers and was mustered out of the volunteer service on March 20, 1866.

After the war
Lieb returned to Illinois where he worked as a newspaper editor, postal worker and author.  He was elected Clerk of Cook County in 1873. Lieb died in Chicago on March 5, 1908.

References
Eicher, John H., & Eicher, David J., Civil War High Commands, Stanford University Press, 2001, .
Five Generals from Decatur
Vicksburg NMP: Battle of Milliken's Bend

Notes

External links

1826 births
1908 deaths
People from Kreuzlingen District
People of the Revolutions of 1848
Swiss emigrants to France
Swiss emigrants to the United States
Union Army colonels
People of Illinois in the American Civil War
Illinois lawyers
People from Decatur, Illinois